Sex is a Japanese manga series written and illustrated by Atsushi Kamijo. It was serialized in Shogakukan's seinen manga magazine Weekly Young Sunday from 1988 to 1992.

Publication
Written and illustrated by Atsushi Kamijo, Sex was serialized in Shogakukan's seinen manga magazine Weekly Young Sunday from 1988 to 1992. Shogakukan initially collected its chapters in two wideban volumes, under the Young Sunday Comics Special imprint, on November 13, 1989, and August 5, 1993; however, the publication of the third volume onwards was halted due to the author's own decision. Over ten years later, Shogakukan republished the series in seven tankōbon volumes from November 5, 2004, to May 2, 2005. Shogakukan re-released the series in five bunkoban volumes from August 10 to December 15, 2012; To commemorate the 30th anniversary of the series, Shogakukan released a 4-volume edition, Sex 30th AnniversaryEdition; they were released from March 25 to August 31, 2017. A promotional video, animated by MAPPA and directed by Sayo Yamamoto, titled Sex ~Prologue~, was launched as a home video exclusive to customers who purchase all four volumes in March 2018.

References

External links
 

Seinen manga
Shogakukan manga